Francis or Frank Blair may refer to:

 Francis Preston Blair Jr. (1821–1875), American politician and Union Army general
 Francis Preston Blair (1791–1876), his father, American journalist and politician
 Frank S. Blair (1839–1899), Virginia lawyer and Attorney General of Virginia
 Frank Blair (journalist) (1915–1995), American broadcast journalist and news anchor on NBC's Today program
 W. Frank Blair, zoologist